René Renner (born 29 November 1993) is an Austrian footballer who plays for LASK Linz.

External links
 
 

Austrian footballers
Association football midfielders
FC Wacker Innsbruck (2002) players
FC Blau-Weiß Linz players
SV Mattersburg players
LASK players
Austrian Football Bundesliga players
2. Liga (Austria) players
Austrian Regionalliga players
1995 births
Living people